Josip Šimić (born 16 September 1977) is a retired Croatian football striker. He is the younger brother of Dario Šimić.

Club career
Šimić started his professional career with Dinamo Zagreb in 1993, when the club was known as Croatia Zagreb. He was also part of the first team when they won four consecutive titles in the Croatian league between 1997 and 2000. In the 1998–1999 and 1999–2000 seasons, he also appeared in a total of 10 UEFA Champions League group matches for the club, memorably scoring the winning goal in their 1–0 away win at Ajax on 25 November 1998.

In 2000, he left his homeland to play in Belgium for Club Brugge before going on to play in the national leagues of Greece, Korea and Austria.

He returned to Croatia in 2006, signing for Varteks as a free agent upon the end of his contract with FC Kärnten. After an alleged injury problem and only a few appearances, he left Varteks in the summer of 2007.

International career
Šimić was a Croatian youth international between 1993 and 2000, making over 20 international appearances at under-16 to under-21 levels. He also played for the Croatian national under-21 team at the European Under-21 Championship in 2000.

In January 1999, he appeared for Croatia B in a friendly match against France B and made his full international debut for Croatia on 13 June 1999 against Egypt at the Korea Cup, a friendly international tournament in Seoul. Three days later, he scored his only international goal in a 2–1 win against Mexico during the same tournament.

Between August and October 1999, he made three appearances as a substitute in Croatia's UEFA Euro 2000 qualifiers against Malta, the Republic of Ireland and Yugoslavia. Croatia failed to qualify for the finals after finishing third in their qualifying group. Šimić's final full international appearance came on 26 April 2000 in a friendly match against Austria. He won a total of 7 full international caps for Croatia.

International goal

Honours
Dinamo Zagreb
Prva HNL: 1996–97, 1997–98, 1998–99, 1999–00

Club Brugge
Belgian Cup: 2001–02

Individual
Korea Cup Most Valuable Player: 1999

References

External links

Josip Šimić at the Croatian Football Federation
Josip Šimić profile at Nogometni Magazin 

1977 births
Living people
Footballers from Zagreb
Association football forwards
Croatian footballers
Croatia under-21 international footballers
Croatia international footballers
GNK Dinamo Zagreb players
Club Brugge KV players
Aris Thessaloniki F.C. players
Ulsan Hyundai FC players
FC Kärnten players
NK Varaždin players
Croatian Football League players
Belgian Pro League players
Super League Greece players
K League 1 players
2. Liga (Austria) players
Croatian expatriate footballers
Expatriate footballers in Greece
Croatian expatriate sportspeople in Greece
Expatriate footballers in Belgium
Croatian expatriate sportspeople in Belgium
Expatriate footballers in Austria
Croatian expatriate sportspeople in Austria
Expatriate footballers in South Korea
Croatian expatriate sportspeople in South Korea